Saintfield High School is a secondary school in Saintfield, County Down, Northern Ireland that teaches compulsory education up to GCSE level. It was established in 1958. Sarah-Lucy Hynds is the current principal of the school.

History 
Saintfield High first opened under the name Saintield Secondary Intermediate School in 1958 with only 5 teachers and 154 students, with its first principal being Mr Johnston Young. The schools name was changed to its current name by Principal Mr Ronald MacPherson during his tenure between 1975-1988.

The school celebrated its 60th anniversary in 2018.

Buildings 
In 1991, then principal Mr Robert Mills began improving the buildings to accommodate for an increase in demand for student places at the school. This included improvements to "school fabric and structure"  and the addition of some temporary classrooms.

In June 2004, Mr Mills retired as works were going to start on a new extension to the existing buildings. This project was overseen by the new principal Mrs Vivian Watt. The new extension opened in 2006.

In 2016, the school opened its new sports hall, with an accompanying reception area, and is officially named the "Vivien Watt Sports Hall".

The school buildings have solar panelling installed on the roof.

GCSE Success Rate 
The school states that, in 2022, 92% of students achieved 5 or more GCSE grades at A*-C, with 85% of all students achieving 5 or more GCSE grades at A*-C including English and maths.

See also 
 List of secondary schools in Northern Ireland
 Education in Northern Ireland

References

External links
 Saintfield High School website

Secondary schools in County Down
Educational institutions established in 1958
1958 establishments in Northern Ireland